Léopold Sédar Senghor International Airport is an international freight and former passenger airport serving Dakar, the capital of Senegal. The airport is situated near the town of Yoff, a northern suburb of Dakar. It was known as Dakar-Yoff International Airport until 9 October 1996, when it was renamed in honor of Léopold Sédar Senghor, the first president of Senegal.

History
During World War II, Dakar Airport was a key link in the United States Army Air Forces Air Transport Command Natal-Dakar air route, which provided a transoceanic link between Brazil and French West Africa after 1942. Massive amounts of cargo were stored at Dakar, which were then transported along the North African Cairo-Dakar transport route for cargo, transiting aircraft and personnel. From Dakar, flights were made to Dakhla Airport, near Villa Cisneros in what was then Spanish Sahara, or to Atar Airport, depending on the load on the air route. In addition to being the western terminus of the North African route, Dakar was the northern terminus for the South African route, which transported personnel to Pretoria, South Africa, with numerous stopovers at Robertsfield (now Roberts International Airport), Liberia, the Belgian Congo and Northern Rhodesia.

Before the introduction of long-range jets in the mid-1970s, it was an important stopover point for the routes between Europe and South America, along with the Canary Islands.

The airport was a Space Shuttle landing site until 1987, when it was determined that a dip in the runway could damage the shuttle upon landing.

It was one of the five main hubs of the now defunct multi-national airline Air Afrique.

The airport has often been used as a stopover on flights between North America and Southern Africa. Delta Air Lines started service on 4 December 2006 between Atlanta and Johannesburg, with an intermediate stop in Dakar. This stopover has since been removed, with Dakar now served nonstop by Delta from New York–JFK. South African Airways used Dakar as a stopover with both its flights from Johannesburg to Washington and New York. The stopover for the New York–JFK flight was later removed, while the Johannesburg to Washington–Dulles flight now operates via Accra.

Senegal Airlines had a hub operation and their headquarters at the airport before the company's demise in April, 2016.

Saudi Binladin Group constructed the new airport, named after the first black African elected to France's parliament in 1914, Blaise Diagne. It was initially expected to take 30 months to build and is designed for an initial capacity of 3 million passengers a year – almost double the 1.7 million annual traffic handled by the existing airport. Blaise Diagne was delayed several times and finally opened on 7 December 2017. As of March 2020 Senghor Airport serves only charter flights and scheduled cargo services, but not regular passenger flights.

Other facilities
The head office of Agence Nationale de l'Aviation Civile du Sénégal is also on the airport property.

At one time Air Sénégal International had its head office on the grounds of the airport.

The airport is also home to the French Air Force's Dakar-Ouakam Air Base (Base aérienne Dakar-Ouakam; also known as Air Base 160, Base aérienne 160 Dakar-Ouakam). The Dakar-Ouakam Air Base formed the military section of the airport. The airport can handle wide body jets, including in the past the Airbus A340-600 from South African Airways, and the Boeing 777-200 from Air France. In 2015, the airport served about 1,986,000 passengers.

Airlines and destinations

Passenger
Since the opening of its successor in 2017, there are no longer any scheduled commercial passenger flights at the airport.

Cargo

Statistics

Incidents
 On 29 August 1960, Air France Flight 343 crashed while attempting to land at Dakar-Yoff Airport during the precursor to what became Hurricane Donna. All 63 passengers and crew on board were killed.

References

External links
 Air Base Profile from avions-militaires.net
 Profile in French from the French Ministry of Defense
 Dakar International Airport (unofficial website)
 
 
 

Airports in Senegal
Buildings and structures in Dakar
Airfields of the United States Army Air Forces Air Transport Command on the South Atlantic Route
Installations of the French Air and Space Force